Kohneh Bridge is a bridge across the river Qaresoo in the eastern suburb of Kermanshah, in Iran.  It is near the village of Morad Abad.

Description
When the city was walled, people would cross the bridge to the city gate called Isfahan-Gate. The bridge extends 186 m and its width is 9 meters wide in an eastern-western direction. The supports of the bridge are hexagonal, and their interior parts are constructed with rubble-stone and plaster mortar, and their facing is of chiseled stone-blocks. The bridge has six spans. The spans have ribbed arches and are made of brick. The medium height of the arches from the tip of the arch to the river bed is 4.4 m.

In the northern and southern sides of the bridge there are brick buttresses on some break waters, and between every two buttresses on the supports there is a nine-meter vestibule with a ribbed arch extending nine meters. These vestibules and circular buttresses on both sides of the bridge have made the bridge one of the most beautiful bridges of the Safavid Period.

History
It seems that the stone-supports of the bridge were constructed during the reign of the Sassanids. The Seljuk brickworks around the bridge indicate the repairment of the bridge during that time. Finally, it was reconstructed in its present shape during the Safavid era.

Seljuk bridges in Iran
Architecture in Iran
Buildings and structures in Kermanshah